Santiago González and Aisam-ul-Haq Qureshi were the defending champions but chose not to defend their title.

Julian Cash and Henry Patten won the title after defeating Ramkumar Ramanathan and John-Patrick Smith 7–5, 6–4 in the final.

Seeds

Draw

References

External links
 Main draw

Ilkley Trophy - Men's doubles
2022 men's doubles